Langlands Park may refer to:

Langlands Park, a rugby league stadium in Brisbane, Australia
Langlands Park busway station, a bus station in Brisbane, Australia
Langlands Park, the home ground of Scottish football team Linthouse F.C. until 1894